In the Name of the King (German: Im Namen des Königs) is a 1924 German silent film directed by Erich Schönfelder and starring Dagny Servaes, Walter Rilla and Magda Unger.

The film's sets were designed by the art director Fritz Lederer.

Cast
 Dagny Servaes
 Walter Rilla
 Magda Unger
 Julius Falkenstein
 Elisabeth Lennartz
 Adi Gröger
 Heinz Stieda

References

Bibliography
 Bock, Hans-Michael & Bergfelder, Tim. The Concise CineGraph. Encyclopedia of German Cinema. Berghahn Books, 2009.

External links

1924 films
Films of the Weimar Republic
Films directed by Erich Schönfelder
German silent feature films
German black-and-white films